The North Sea Commission (NSC) is an international organization founded in 1989. It facilitates partnerships between regions connected with the North Sea and promotes the North Sea Region as an economic entity within Europe. It is part of the Conference of Peripheral Maritime Regions, a pan-European organization for subnational governments.

The presidency of the North Sea Commission is made up of one president and two vice presidents who are elected every two years. The work is organized in four thematic groups, based on the four priorities of the organization's strategy North Sea Region 2020: Managing Maritime Space, Increased accessibility and sustainable transport, Tackling climate change, and Attractive and sustainable communities.
  
President: Tjisse Stelpstra, Drenthe (Netherlands)

Vice President: Marianne Chesak, Rogaland (Norway)
 
Vice President: Andreas Lervik, Østfold (Norway)

Members

Denmark
North Denmark
Central Denmark
South Denmark

Belgium
West Flanders

Germany
Bremen
Lower Saxony
Schleswig-Holstein

Netherlands
Samenwerkingsverband Noord-Nederland
Drenthe
Friesland
Groningen 
Flevoland
North Holland
South Holland
Zeeland

Norway
Aust-Agder
Buskerud
Hordaland
Møre og Romsdal
Rogaland
Sogn og Fjordane
Sør-Trøndelag
Telemark
Vest-Agder
Vestfold
Østfold

Sweden
Halland
Västra Götaland
Örebro

United Kingdom

England
Southend-on-Sea

Scotland
Highland
City of Aberdeen
Aberdeenshire
Fife

See also 
 North Sea
 North Sea Region (NSR)
 North Sea Region Programme (NSRP)

References

External links
 North Sea Commission official website

North Sea
International organizations based in Europe
Organizations established in 1989